Scapular artery can refer to:

 Circumflex scapular artery
 Dorsal scapular artery
 Suprascapular artery, also known as transverse scapular artery